Harold Sumner Tolley (January 16, 1894 – May 20, 1956) was a Republican member of the United States House of Representatives from New York.

Biography
Tolley was born in Honesdale, Pennsylvania. He graduated from Syracuse University in 1916. He served in the military during World War I from May 13, 1917, until July 25, 1919, attaining the rank of captain. He was elected to Congress in 1924 and served from March 4, 1925, until March 3, 1927. He was commissioner of public welfare for Binghamton, New York from January 1932 until April 1937. He died in Kenmore, New York.

Sources
 

1894 births
1956 deaths
Syracuse University alumni
Republican Party members of the United States House of Representatives from New York (state)
20th-century American politicians